"No Place Like Home" is the second UK single released from Squeeze's sixth album, Cosi Fan Tutti Frutti. Identical cover art was used for the "By Your Side" single released elsewhere in Europe.

Track listing
7"
 "No Place Like Home" (4:26)
 "The Fortnight Saga" (2:40)

12"
 "No Place Like Home" (4:26)
 "Last Time Forever" (4:15)
 "The Fortnight Saga" (2:40)

External links
Squeeze discography at Squeezenet

Squeeze (band) songs
1985 singles
Songs written by Glenn Tilbrook
Songs written by Chris Difford
1985 songs
A&M Records singles